The Christmas Creek, a perennial stream that is part of the Macleay River catchment, is located in the Mid North Coast region of New South Wales, Australia.

Course and features
The river flows generally south southeast before reaching its confluence with the Macleay River at Frederickton. The river descends  over its  course.

See also

 Rivers of New South Wales
 List of rivers of New South Wales (A-K)
 List of rivers of Australia

References

External links
 
 Northern Rivers Geology Blog - Macleay River

 

Rivers of New South Wales
Mid North Coast
Kempsey Shire